Jim Manley is an artist, born on 17 January 1934, in St Helens, Lancashire, England. He has lived in Killough, County Down, Northern Ireland since 1971. He uses mixed media (mainly water colours and acrylic).

Selected exhibitions - Jim Manley

1976 Arts Council Gallery, Belfast
1978 Davis Gallery, Dublin
1979/80 Bell Gallery, Belfast
1982/84 Lincoln Gallery, Dublin
1985 Fenderesky Gallery, Belfast
1986 Hendricks Gallery, Dublin
1989/91 Solomon Gallery, Dublin
1992/94/97/99 Duncan Campbell, London
1992/93 The coast of Co. Down, Downpatrick, Sligo, Cavan, Armagh
1993 Bluecoat Chambers, Liverpool
1995 Basement Gallery, Dundalk
1996 Dyehouse Gallery, Waterford
1997 Blackcombe Gallery, Cork
1997 Ayesha Castle, Killiney
1998 Wolfson College, Oxford
1998 Croatian Embassy, London
2000 Dyehouse Gallery, Waterford
2000 Bluecoat Chambers Gallery, Liverpool
2001/3 Duncan Campbell, London
2004 Origin Gallery, Dublin
2003 Linen Hall Library, Belfast
2004 Origins Gallery, Dublin
2004 Cill Rallaig, County Kerry
2005 Tom Caldwell Gallery, Belfast
2008 The Yard Gallery, Portaferry
2010 Castle Espie, Comber, County Down
2010 Caldwell Gallery Belfast

Selected exhibitions - various artists

1980/99 Royal Ulster Academy (RUA)
1988 Ulster Way - Galleries throughout Ireland
1989 The Mournes, Narrow Water Gallery, Warrenpoint
1990 Young EVA, Limerick
1991 Paradise Island, Bluecoat Chambers, Liverpool
1991/99 IONTAS, Sligo
1994 Watercolours at the Walker, Liverpool
1995 Blian is Fice as Fag, Sligi
1997 Honouring Colmcille, Donegal/Edinburgh
2003 Exhibition of the Sea, Leith, Edinburgh
2004 IONTAS, Sligo
2007 Sunday Times Watercolour Exhibition

Awards

1979 McGonigal Prize, Oireachtas
1984 Paton's Prize, EVA
1997 Landscape Prize, RUA
1997 Elmwood Gallery, Smallworks
1999 Painting Prize, IONTAS
2005 Ross's Watercolour Prize, RUA

Watercolours purchased by public collections

Conrad Hotel - Dublin
UTV - Belfast
Stormont Castle - Belfast
Abbott Hall - Kendal
Walker Art Gallery- Liverpool
Bank of Ireland - Dublin
Allied Irish Bank International
Arts Council of Northern Ireland
Down County Museum

Watercolours purchased by private collections
His Excellency the Croatian Ambassador - Dubrovnik
Seamus Heaney
Stephen Rea
Dean Sullivan
Lady Lea Leigh
the late Colin Middleton

See also
List of Northern Irish artists

External links
 http://www.royalulsteracademy.org/the-academy/members/james-manley?modal

References

Living people
British contemporary painters
Painters from Northern Ireland
1934 births
People from St Helens, Merseyside